Bombard Renewable Energy is an American provider of renewable energy services. Bombard's primary services include the design, financing, construction, installation, operations, and maintenance of solar photovoltaic ("PV") energy systems.  Additionally, Bombard performs energy efficiency audits, designs, and constructs mobile solar PV charging stations.

History
Bombard Renewable Energy, located in Las Vegas, Nevada, is an indirect, wholly owned subsidiary of MDU Resources Group, Inc. ("MDU"). Bombard Electric, LLC, founded in 1982 and acquired by MDU in 2005, later added the renewable energy division, Bombard Renewable Energy, in 2006.  Bombard Renewable Energy has installed more than 70 Megawatts of Solar PV systems in Nevada and nationwide, both in the public and private sectors.  In 2018, Bombard was ranked 13th on the Solar Power World's Top 100 Solar Contractors list as measured by kWh installed in 2027 with 235,848.3 kWh installed in 2020.  In 2020, Bombard was 300th with 1,488 kWh installed capacity.

Bombard's staff includes four North American Board of Certified Energy Practitioners ("NABCEP") PV Installers, two of the first NABCEP certified Technical Sales staff in the United States, as well as the nation's second Underwriters Laboratories (UL), certified PV installer.

Outreach
In 2009 Bombard donated and installed a 3-kilowatt Solar PV system at the Shade Tree Shelter in Las Vegas, consisting of 14 solar photovoltaic modules. The system was installed on the roof of Noah's animal house, The Shade Tree's animal shelter. The shelter will produce about 6000 or more kWh per year which will save them up to $500 per month from their monthly average energy bill of $5,000.

Major Projects 

In 2007, Bombard installed 11% of all grid-tied Solar Photovoltaic systems nationwide, to include an installation of 14 megawatts Nellis Solar Power Plant that generates about 25 million kilowatt-hrs of electricity annually and is located in the Nellis Air Force Base in Las Vegas.  Bombard is also a partner with the local utility, NV Energy.

Nellis Air Force Base
14.2 Megawatt Ground Mount, Single Axis Tracking System.SunPower contracted Bombard to conduct R&D and to perform the installation of all solar PV and electrical equipment.

City of Las Vegas
3.5 Megawatt Ground Mount, Single Axis Tracking System for Water pollution Control Facility.

Las Vegas Valley Water District
3.1 Megawatts for various reservoirs (in conjunction with PowerLight Corporation).

Las Vegas Water District's Ronzone Reservoir
800 Kilowatt Ground Mounted Photovoltaic System (with PowerLight Corporation)

Clark County School District
690 Kilowatts of Photovoltaic Systems on eleven different schools.

Andre Agassi College Preparatory Academy
511 Kilowatts Photovoltaic System using ballasted roof mounted and covered parking mounting solutions.

Springs Preserve
400 Kilowatt Photovoltaic System(with PowerLight Corporation).

PBS Educational Technology Campus
In 2008, 182 kW PV system which consists of 792 SunPower  SPR-230WHT solar modules. Generating approximately 73,600 kWh per yr.

UNLV, Greenspun College of Urban Affairs
135 Kilowatt Design-Build Photovoltaic System.

Ryan Operations Center (Nevada Power Co.)
115 Kilowatt Design-Build Photovoltaic System.

Las Vegas-Clark County Library District
103 Kilowatt Photovoltaic System using Ballasted roof mounted solution.

Sierra Plaza (Sierra Pacific Power Company Reno, NV)
90 Kilowatt Design-Build Photovoltaic/Wind Hybrid System.

Las Vegas Metro Police Department
Three locations totaling 90 kilowatts of Off-Grid Photovoltaic System using Fixed Ground Mounted solution.

Downtown Reno Wind Turbine 
In 2009, the first wind turbine installed in downtown Reno.

Welcome to Fabulous Las Vegas sign 
In 2014, solar energy for the Welcome to Fabulous Las Vegas sign.

See also
 Renewable energy

References

External links
 Bombard Renewable Energy. (Main website)

Companies based in Paradise, Nevada
1982 establishments in Nevada